Michael Fitzpatrick (12 October 1942 – 14 October 2011) was an Irish Fianna Fáil politician. He was elected as Teachta Dála (TD) for the Kildare North constituency at the 2007 general election, and served until 2011.

He was a member of Kildare County Council for the Clane electoral area from 1999 to 2007. He was a member of the Garda Síochána from 1961 to 1972. He was the constituency manager in Kildare for former Minister for Finance and European Commissioner Charlie McCreevy from 1992 to 2007. He also was a Kildare mayor.

In 2010, he was diagnosed with motor neurone disease. In an interview with The Irish Times on 12 March 2010, he said he intended to keep working as a TD.

Fitzpatrick said he had “compared notes” with Brian Lenihan. “We are both on a journey. We talk and chat to one another about our illnesses”. He gave a presentation on his condition to the Irish Motor Neurone Research Foundation.

He lost his seat at the February 2011 general election and died that October. Fianna Fáil cancelled its Wolfe Tone commemoration at Bodenstown, County Kildare as a mark of respect. His funeral was in the Church of the Immaculate Conception, Allenwood, County Kildare.

References

 

1942 births
2011 deaths
Deaths from motor neuron disease
Neurological disease deaths in the Republic of Ireland
Fianna Fáil TDs
Garda Síochána officers
Irish auctioneers
Local councillors in County Kildare
Mayors of places in the Republic of Ireland
Members of the 30th Dáil
Politicians from County Cavan